Dawg or DAWG may refer to:

People
Phife Dawg or simply Phife (1970–2016), American rapper and a member of the group A Tribe Called Quest
Smoke Dawg, Canadian rapper
White Dawg, American rapper and record producer

Arts and entertainment
 Dawg (film), a romantic-comedy film (also known as Bad Boy) starring Liz Hurley and Denis Leary
Dawg '90, an all-instrumental album by American musician David Grisman, recorded with his group David Grisman Quintet in 1990
 Dawg, the nickname of American mandolinist David Grisman

Fictional characters
 Dawg, a fictional dog from the DC Comics series, Lobo
 Dawg, a companion of The Dandy comics Desperate Dan

Sports
 Okotoks Dawgs, collegiate baseball team
 Informal nickname used by University of Georgia Bulldog athletics
 Informal nickname used by University of Washington Husky athletics
 Informal nickname used by Louisiana Tech University Bulldog athletics

Abbreviation
 Directed acyclic word graph (disambiguation)
 Deputy's Advisory Working Group, a governance body within the United States Department of Defense
 Dynamically Allocated Way Guard, a mitigation approach to the Spectre security vulnerability

See also 
 
 Dog (disambiguation)
 Dogg (disambiguation)